Wishka Hirka (Ancash Quechua wishka viscacha, hirka mountain, "viscacha mountain") or Wishpa Hirka (Ancash Quechua wishpa influenza, "influenza mountain", Hispanicized spelling Huishpajirca) is a  mountain in the southern part of the Cordillera Blanca in the Andes of Peru. It is located in the Ancash Region, Recuay Province, Catac District. Wishka Hirka lies southwest of Qiwllarahu.

See also 
Quñuqqucha

References

Mountains of Peru
Mountains of Ancash Region